Tomasz Warczachowski (born September 13, 1974 in Toruń) is a Polish football defender who played in the II liga (second tier) for Arka Gdynia and Unia Janikowo.

Career

Club
The club he spent a lot of years of his career was Pomorzanin Toruń.

In July 2009, he joined Zawisza Bydgoszcz.

References

External links
 

1974 births
Living people
Sportspeople from Toruń
Polish footballers
Stal Stalowa Wola players
Unia Janikowo players
Arka Gdynia players
Zawisza Bydgoszcz players
Association football defenders